Bhajaman Behara is an Indian politician, belonging to Janata Dal. In the 2009 election he was elected to the Lok Sabha from Dhenkanal in Odisha and he was Union Minister of State, Petroleum & Chemicals.

References

External links
Official biographical sketch in Parliament of India website

India MPs 1989–1991
Odisha politicians
Living people
Lok Sabha members from Odisha
1943 births
Janata Dal politicians
Indian National Congress politicians
Trinamool Congress politicians